Maymana Airport  is a public use airport located near Maymana, Faryab, Afghanistan.

Airlines and destinations
As of September 2018, there are no scheduled services at the airport.

See also
List of airports in Afghanistan

References

External links 
 Airport record for Maymana Airport at Landings.com

Airports in Afghanistan
Faryab Province